Ramesh Pathirana  is a Sri Lankan politician, a member of the Parliament of Sri Lanka and is serving as the current Minister of Plantation Industries and Minister of Industries.  He belongs to the Sri Lanka Podujana Peramuna. He was educated at Richmond College, Galle and University of Peradeniya. He is a physician by profession and is the son of former Education and Higher Education minister Richard Pathirana.

Political career 
He was appointed as Minister of Plantation Industries and Export Agriculture on 22 November 2019.

He was appointed as Minister of Plantation on 12th August 2020 by the SLPP government.

Political Interference in the Police

After the 20th Amendment to the Sri Lankan Constitution reduced the independence of the police Ramesh Pathirana was accused by other SLPP MPs of assuming the power of the police chief. SLPP legislator Chandima Weerakkody claimed that all police transfers were done according to letters sent by Pathirana where many OICs were appointed according to political ties rather than merit where many inexperienced officers were promoted over senior experienced officers. Thus the police was incapable of handling the mass violence that occurred when loyalists of Mahinda Rajapaksa including those brought by Pathirana attacked peaceful protestors on 9 May 2022. The resulting retaliatory riots destroyed many houses of Rajapaksa loyalists including that of Pathirana as the politicised police was incapable was handling the situation.

Elections 
Elected to parliament first in 2010.

In the 2020 general elections held on 5th August 2020 he won the highest preferential votes of 205,814 in the Galle district.

Notes

References

Members of the 14th Parliament of Sri Lanka
Members of the 15th Parliament of Sri Lanka
Members of the 16th Parliament of Sri Lanka
Sri Lanka Freedom Party politicians
United People's Freedom Alliance politicians
1969 births
People from Galle
Alumni of Richmond College, Galle
Living people
Sinhalese politicians